The Corsican Brothers is a 1920 American silent historical adventure film directed by Colin Campbell and starring Dustin Farnum, Winifred Kingston, and Wedgwood Nowell. It is an adaptation of the novel The Corsican Brothers by Alexandre Dumas.

Cast
 Dustin Farnum as Louis de Franchi / Fabiel de Franchi 
 Winifred Kingston as Emile de Lesparre 
 Wedgwood Nowell as Chateau Renaud
 Will Machin as Le Baron Montigiron
 Ogden Crane as Gaeno Orlando
 Fanny Midgley as Madame Savilia Dei Franchi
 Andrew Robson as General de Lesparre

References

Bibliography
 Donald W. McCaffrey & Christopher P. Jacobs. Guide to the Silent Years of American Cinema. Greenwood Publishing, 1999.

External links
 

1920 films
1920s historical adventure films
American silent feature films
American historical adventure films
American black-and-white films
Films directed by Colin Campbell
Films based on The Corsican Brothers
Films set in Corsica
Films set in the 19th century
Films based on French novels
1920s English-language films
1920s American films
Silent historical adventure films